Ali Al-Shoalah (born 29 October 1988) is a Saudi football player. He currently plays for Al-Taraji as a winger.

Honours
Al-Khaleej 
First Division: 2021–22, runner-up 2013–14

References

External links 
 

Living people
1988 births
Saudi Arabian footballers
Al-Taraji Club players
Khaleej FC players
Al-Faisaly FC players
Place of birth missing (living people)
Saudi First Division League players
Saudi Professional League players
Saudi Second Division players
Association football forwards
Saudi Arabian Shia Muslims